100 Hearts is a solo piano album by Michel Petrucciani. It was recorded in 1983 and released by George Wein Collection before being reissued by Blue Note Records.

Recording and music
The solo piano album was recorded in RCA Studio A, New York City, in June 1983. It was produced by Gabreal Franklin. The material consists of compositions by Ornette Coleman, Charlie Haden, Sonny Rollins, two Petrucciani originals, and a medley of "Someday My Prince Will Come", "All the Things You Are", "A Child Is Born", and "Very Early".

Releases and reception

100 Hearts was released by George Wein Collection. It was reissued by Blue Note Records. The AllMusic reviewer concluded that it was "A very impressive outing." The Penguin Guide to Jazz commented that the album "established Petrucciani as one of the great romantic virtuosos in the jazz of his time".

Track listing
"Turn Around"
"Three Forgotten Magic Words"
"Silence"
"St. Thomas"
"Pot Pouri (Medley): Someday My Prince Will Come/All the Things You Are/A Child Is Born/Very Early"
"100 Hearts"

Personnel
Michel Petrucciani – piano

References

Michel Petrucciani albums
Solo piano jazz albums